On 5 March 2023, a fire began in the Kutupalong refugee camp in south-east Bangladesh, resulting in the destruction of more than 2,000 shelters and the displacement of 12,000 refugees.

Background 
The Kutupalong refugee camp is considered the world's largest refugee camp, sheltering Rohingya refugees from Myanmar. Between January 2021 and December 2022, there were in excess of 222 fire incidents in the camp, including 60 incidents of arson.

Fire 
The fire began on 5 March 2023 at 2.45pm in the Balukhali camp in Cox's Bazar, destroying more than 2,000 shelters, many made of bamboo and tarpaulin, after spreading through gas cylinders in kitchens. The fire was brought under control within three hours by volunteers and local firefighting services.

Impact 
No casualties were reported. More than 12,000 refugees from Myanmar were left without shelter due to the fire. 35 mosques and 21 learning centres for refugees were also destroyed.

References

2023 disasters in Bangladesh
2023 fires in Asia
March 2023 events in Bangladesh
Fires in Bangladesh
Refugees in Bangladesh
Rohingya people
Cox's Bazar District